Hoseynabad-e Harom (also Romanized as Ḩoseynābād-e Hārom; also known as Ḩoseynābād) is a village in Kushk-e Qazi Rural District, in the Central District of Fasa County, Fars Province, Iran. At the 2006 census, its population was 108, in 22 families.

References 

Populated places in Fasa County